Golden Ears Way is a two-to-six lane road in Greater Vancouver, British Columbia. It connects Maple Ridge and Pitt Meadows to Langley and Surrey via the Golden Ears Bridge. It is designed to keep traffic movements to and from the Golden Ears Bridge simple and streamlined, and intersections and interchanges have been placed with regards to accessing existing industrial and commercial areas on either side of the river in Port Kells and the Ridge-Meadows area of Maple Ridge, immediately west of Hammond.

The road is under the jurisdiction of TransLink, the organization responsible for the regional transportation network in the Greater Vancouver region. On August 25, 2017, B.C. Premier John Horgan announced that all tolls on the Golden Ears bridge will be removed starting September 1, 2017.

Route details
The expressway begins at 96th Avenue just west of Highway 15 in Surrey, a major route leading to the U.S. border, and continues eastward, passing through intersections to access the Port Kells Industrial Area. The Golden Ears Way becomes a freeway after the 192nd Street intersection and links 200th Street south to Langley City Centre, before curving northward onto the Golden Ears Bridge. In Maple Ridge, interchanges have been constructed close to commercial areas; a particular focus is the interchange at Highway 7, where most Golden Ears Way traffic is expected to exit the connector. The road past Highway 7 is mostly a two-laned expressway linking to residential and agricultural areas in the north of Maple Ridge, ending at the intersection with 210th Street and continuing beyond as 128th Avenue.

Exit list
The entire route is in Metro Vancouver.

References

External links

TransLink.ca - Golden Ears Bridge

Highways in Greater Vancouver
Roads in British Columbia